Otur may refer to:

 Otur (Valdés), Spain
 Otur, Maharashtra, India
 Otur Sara, Iran